Komboassi may refer to:

In Gnagna Province, Burkina Faso:

Komboassi, Bogandé
Komboassi, Manni